Robert Labine (23 December 1940 – 4 February 2021) was a politician in Gatineau, Quebec. He was best known for being mayor of the former city of Gatineau between 1988 and 1994 and again between 1999 and 2001. He was familiarly known as "Bob" Labine.

Career
Labine was born in Gatineau, Quebec. He entered politics as a councillor of Gatineau in 1968 and remained at that position until 1978. He was elected mayor in 1988 and re-elected for a second mandate in 1991. Due to conflicts of interest, he resigned in 1994 before re-entering politics in 1999 after then-incumbent mayor Guy Lacroix stepped down after five years as mayor. Labine defeated future ADQ candidate Berthe Miron.

In 2001, Labine competed against then-Hull incumbent mayor Yves Ducharme and lost. After the election, he had little involvement in municipal politics.

During his first mandate, Labine (along with former Aylmer mayor Constance Provost) opposed a project of regrouping the cities of Hull, Aylmer and Gatineau in the early 1990s. The merger did occur in 2002 when a bill by the Parti Québécois forced the merger of those three municipalities along with Buckingham and Masson-Angers. In 2000, Labine mentioned that a merger would not save money.

During his tenure as mayor, Labine was in favour of building a new sports complex in the Gatineau sector. However, the building was built only a decade later, in 2010, due to negotiations with other levels of governments regarding funding. The mayor of the new city of Gatineau, Marc Bureau, had committed to having this project realized. Labine was also in favour of building an additional bridge to Ottawa in the east end of the metropolitan area, via  Kettle Island towards the Aviation Parkway, a controversial project that was opposed by many Ottawa residents.

After his political career, Labine led a successful bid for the city of Gatineau to obtain the 2010 Quebec Summer Games in which it defeated four other bids coming from Vaudreuil-Dorion, Shawinigan, Rivière-du-Loup and Charlevoix.

Personal life
Labine was married and had two children. He died in the Hull sector of Gatineau on 4 February 2021, aged 80.

Electoral record (partial)

See the 1987 Gatineau municipal election page for details on Deschênes and Leroux.Source: David Gamble, "Labine wins tight race for mayor in Gatineau," Ottawa Citizen, 6 June 1988, A1.

References

External links
 Partial Biography of Robert Labine

1940 births
2021 deaths
Mayors of Gatineau
History of Gatineau
French Quebecers